Herbert Bradwell Titus (December 11, 1833 – June 1, 1905) was a Union brevet brigadier general during the period of the American Civil War. He received his appointment as brevet brigadier general dated to March 13, 1865. During much of the war, Titus served as a colonel with the 9th New Hampshire Volunteer Infantry.

Herbert Titus' father was a renowned teacher named Ezra Titus. Herbert Titus followed in his father's footsteps to become a teacher at age 14. In 1854, he began attending Yale College until his generous benefactor died. On June 4, 1861, he was commissioned as a second lieutenant in the 2nd New Hampshire Volunteer Infantry and was promoted to major of the 9th New Hampshire Volunteer Infantry later that month. On November 22, 1862, he became the regiment's colonel. Titus was disabled and away from combat for five months after he was wounded at the Battle of Antietam.  

When Lee surrendered at Appomattox on April 9, 1865, Titus was in command of a brigade of ten regiments. After the war, he purchased land in Virginia and worked as a farmer and later worked in New York City as a lawyer.

References

External links

See also

Union Army colonels
People of New Hampshire in the American Civil War
1833 births
1905 deaths